Midang Literary Award (hangul: 미당문학상) is established in June 2001 by the JoongAng Ilbo to honor the literary achievements of Seo Jeong-ju. ('Midang' is a penname of Seo Jeong-ju). In 2001, it was established with the Hwang Soon-won Literature Award in the novel section. The prize money is 30 million won.

On the other hand, the Writers Association of Korea argues the abolition of the literary award in connection with the pro-Japanese activities of Midang.

Winners

See also
 Poet Midang Memorial Hall

References

South Korean literary awards
Poetry awards
Awards established in 2001